Tales of Wells Fargo is an American Western television series starring Dale Robertson that ran from 1957 to 1962 on NBC. Produced by Revue Productions, the series aired in a half-hour format until its final season, when it expanded to an hour and switched from black-and-white to color.

Synopsis

Set in the 1870s and 1880s, the series starred Oklahoma native Dale Robertson as Wells Fargo special agent Jim Hardie, noted at the time as "the left-handed gun". The character was fictional, but the series' development was influenced by the biography of Wells Fargo detective Fred J. Dodge. Agent Hardie was shown working cases in many areas of the Old West, occasionally interacting with legendary outlaws such as Jesse James and Belle Starr, as well as with other American historical figures. Hardie's own history was rarely discussed, but one episode gave a detailed backstory, portraying him as a Louisiana-born drifter who almost became an outlaw before finding his true mission in life.

In the final season, when episodes were longer, Hardie was given a base of operations, in a town called Gloribee, and four regular supporting characters were added. Hardie usually rode a chestnut gelding with a white blaze on his face and four white stockings. The horse actually belonged to Dale Robertson, and was named "Jubilee". In at least one episode, Jubilee came when Hardie whistled and called his name.

Cast

Lead
 Dale Robertson as Jim Hardie, Wells Fargo agent

Recurring
 Jack Ging as Beau McCloud
 William Demarest as Jeb Gaine (1961–1962)
 Virginia Christine as Ovie (1961–1962)
 Lory Patrick as Tina (1961–1962)
 Mary Jayne Saunders as Mary Gee Swenson (1961-1962)

Notable guest stars

 Nick Adams 
 Stanley Adams
 Claude Akins, five times, once as John L. Sullivan
 Rico Alaniz
 Eddie Albert
 Chris Alcaide
 Fred Aldrich
 Morris Ankrum
 Roscoe Ates
 Roy Barcroft
 Trevor Bardette
 Rayford Barnes
 Baynes Barron
 Hugh Beaumont as Jesse James 
 John Beradino, three times
 Lyle Bettger as John Wesley Hardin
 Dan Blocker
 Nesdon Booth
 Lane Bradford
 Stewart Bradley
 Steve Brodie
 Charles Bronson as Butch Cassidy
 Johnny Mack Brown
 Edgar Buchanan
 Walter Burke
 Terry Burnham
 King Calder
 Harry Carey Jr.
 Robert Carricart
 Stephen Chase
 John Cliff
 James Coburn
 Fred Coby
 Chuck Connors twice, once as Sam Bass
 Bill Coontz
 Ben Cooper
 Jeanne Cooper as Belle Starr
 Ellen Corby
 Walter Coy
 Royal Dano as Cole Younger
 Cesare Danova as Tiburcio Vasquez
 Jim Davis
 John Dehner
 Francis De Sales
 Richard Devon
 Brad Dexter
 John Doucette
 Dan Duryea
 Buddy Ebsen
 Bill Erwin
 Frank Ferguson 
 Paul Fix three times, once as Philip Sheridan
 Ron Foster

 Byron Foulger
 Beverly Garland as Pearl Hart
 Anthony George
 Sam Gilman
 Bruce Gordon
 Leo Gordon
 Tom Greenway
 Dabbs Greer
 Herman Hack
 Chick Hannan
 Ron Hayes
 Myron Healey
 Anne Helm as Nellie Bly
 Kelo Henderson as Ike Clanton
 Tom Hennesy
 Robert 'Buzz' Henry
 Ed Hinton
 Harry Holcombe
 Rex Holman
 Rodolfo Hoyos Jr.
 Clegg Hoyt
 Richard Jaeckel
 Brad Johnson
 I. Stanford Jolley
 Dean Jones
 Bobby Jordan as Bob Ford
 Robert Karnes
 DeForest Kelley
 Ray Kellogg
 Don Kennedy
 Douglas Kennedy
 George Keymas 
 Wright King
 Jess Kirkpatrick
 Fred Krone
 Jack Lambert
 Martin Landau as Doc Holliday
 Michael Landon, three times, twice as a Wells Fargo rider
 John Lasell
 Wesley Lau
 Tom Laughlin
 Norman Leavitt
 Tina Louise
 Barbara Luna
 Herbert Lytton
 Barton MacLane
 Donna Martell
 Carole Mathews
 Ken Mayer
 Ann McCrea
 Lin McCarthy
 Frank McGrath
 Steve McQueen as Bill Longley
 Tyler McVey
 Joyce Meadows
 Don Megowan as Ben Thompson
 Jan Merlin
 Robert Middleton, four times

 John Milford
 James Millhollin
 Ewing Mitchell
 George Mitchell
 Gerald Mohr
 Alan Napier
 Anna Navarro
 Ed Nelson
 Jack Nicholson
 Leonard Nimoy
 Jimmy Noel
 Simon Oakland
 Warren Oates
 J. Pat O'Malley
 Gregg Palmer
 Dennis Patrick
 Wynn Pearce
 John M. Picard
 Phillip Pine as Kid Curry
 Edward Platt as Tom Bell
 Joe Ploski
 Sydney Pollack
 Gilman Rankin
 Addison Richards as Lew Wallace
 Paul Richards as Johnny Ringo
 Jason Robards Sr.
 Willard Sage
 Robert Sampson
 George Sawaya
 Frank J. Scannell
 Vito Scotti
 George Selk
 Richard Shannon
 Alex Sharp
 Dan Sheridan
 Olan Soule
 Warren Stevens as Clay Allison
 Boyd Stockman
 Guy Stockwell
 Barbara Stuart
 Olive Sturgess
 Grant Sullivan
 William Tannen
 Vaughn Taylor
 Guy Teague
 Ray Teal
 Russell Thorson
 Lee Van Cleef
 Robert Vaughn as Billy the Kid
 Gregory Walcott
 Dawn Wells
 Adam West
 Peter Whitney
 Robert J. Wilke
 Guinn Williams

Episodes

Release

Broadcast
The pilot for Tales of Wells Fargo originally premiered as an episode of the anthology series Schlitz Playhouse of Stars.

In the 1960–61 season, Wells Fargo was scheduled opposite ABC's detective series Surfside 6 and CBS's new sitcom Bringing Up Buddy, starring Frank Aletter. Wells Fargo and Surfside 6 survived another year, but Bringing Up Buddy was cancelled. Wells Fargo was the lead-in that year to a new NBC Western, Klondike starring Ralph Taeger and James Coburn, but that series, set in the Klondike Gold Rush town of Skagway, Alaska, survived only 17 episodes.

Home media
Timeless Media Group released the first two seasons on DVD in Region 1.

Ratings
For its first two years, the series was in the top 10 of the Nielsen Ratings. During the 1957–58 season, it was ranked number three, and during the 1958–59 season, it was ranked number seven.

Merchandise
The television series also spawned a number of publications for young readers, including the hardcover book Danger at Dry Creek (Golden Press, 1959), and a series of Dell Comics and Little Golden Books. One of the artists who created this comic-book adaptation was Russ Heath.

References

External links

 
 

1950s Western (genre) television series
1957 American television series debuts
1960s Western (genre) television series
1962 American television series endings
Television series set in the 1870s
Television series set in the 1880s
Black-and-white American television shows
NBC original programming
Television series by Universal Television
Television shows adapted into comics
Wells Fargo